The 1947 Chattanooga Moccasins football team was an American football team that represented the University of Chattanooga during the 1947 college football season. In its 17th year under head coach Scrappy Moore, the team compiled a 4–6 record and was outscored by a total of 179 to 111. The team played its home games at Chamberlain Field in Chattanooga, Tennessee.

Schedule

References

Chattanooga
Chattanooga Mocs football seasons
Chattanooga Moccasins football